Ishtiaq Elahi (born 7 March 1998) is an Indian cricketer. He made his List A debut for Jammu and Kashmir in the 2017–18 Vijay Hazare Trophy on 6 February 2018.

References

External links
 

1998 births
Living people
Indian cricketers
Place of birth missing (living people)
Jammu and Kashmir cricketers